The Windsor Lancers women's basketball team represent the University of Windsor in the Ontario University Athletics conference of U Sports women's basketball. Having won the Bronze Baby for five consecutive years (2011-15), the most recent championship victory occurred at the 2015 CIS Women's Basketball Championship.

History 
The Windsor Lancers women's basketball program is led by Head Coach Chantal Vallée, a native of Montreal, has become one of the top women's basketball programs in the country, having capturing five straight CIS national titles in 2011, 2012, 2013, 2014, and 2015.

In 2008–09, Vallée and the Lancers made history as she led her team to a 21–1 record, their first ever OUA Provincial Championship title and a trip to the CIS National Championships in Saskatchewan, where they finished fourth. In 2010–11, the Lancers won their first ever CIS National Championship title in the program's 50th year. With a 20–2 regular season record, the Lancers were ranked in the top two in the CIS Top Ten all year long and claimed their third straight OUA Provincial Championship. At Nationals, her Lancer squad defeated the Quebec champion Laval Rouge et Or, the AUS champion Cape Breton Capers and the Canada West champion Saskatchewan Huskies to claim the CIS National Championship. With the win, the Lancers became the first host school to ever win a CIS national championship title in women's basketball at home and were also the first team outside of the Canada West Conference to win the Bronze Baby Trophy in the last 19 years.

In 2011–12, Coach Vallée and the Lancer women's basketball team captured their second straight CIS national title with a 69–53 over the second seeded UBC Thunderbirds. Ranked fourth heading into the national tournament, the Lancers defended their 2011 title by defeating AUS champion Acadia in the quarter-final, host Calgary in the semi, and the Canada West winner Thunderbirds to take the Bronze Baby back to Windsor.

In 2012–13, Vallée's squad made program history as they completed an undefeated regular season with a 21–0 record and the No. 1 ranking in Canada. It was the first time in OUA women's basketball history that a team has gone undefeated since moving away from the 12-game schedule and placed first overall in the OUA west division for the fourth consecutive year. In the playoffs, Windsor became only the fourth team in CIS women's basketball history to capture three straight CIS national titles. Coach Vallée's Lancer squad held off Carleton to win their fourth provincial title in five years, and capped off their undefeated season at the national championships with a convincing win over the host Regina Rams in the gold medal game.

In 2013–14, Coach Vallée led her team to an incredible fourth straight CIS national championship title, winning at home for the second time in four years. The Lancers finished the regular season with a sparkling 21–1 record and the No. 1 ranking in Canada. After capturing their fifth OUA title in six seasons, the Lancers knocked off Laurier, Fraser Valley and Saint Mary's to capture the prestigious Bronze Baby trophy as national champions for the fourth consecutive year.
In 2014–15, the Lancers won a historic fifth straight CIS national championship. They finished with an impressive 19–1 conference record and their sixth OUA title in the past seven seasons. Ranked #1 heading into nationals, the Lancers knocked off Laval, Saskatchewan, and McGill to make history and claim their fifth consecutive Bronze Baby trophy as national champions, becoming only the second team in CIS history to do so. The Lancers extended their CIS post-season win streak to 21–0 and Chantal Vallee was honoured as the CIS women's basketball coach of the year for the second consecutive season.

Individual Leader Scoring

U Sports Elite 8 results

International
Miah-Marie Langlois : 2015 Pan American Games 
Korissa Williams : 2015 Summer Universiade

Awards and honors
 Chantal Vallée, 2016 CAAWS Women of Influence Award  
 2017 Windsor Lancers Alumni Sports Hall of Fame Class: Dranadia Roc

University honors
Kayah Clarke, 2017 Windsor Lancers Athletics Female Rookie of the Year
Emily Prevost, 2018 The Captain's Trophy
Carly Steer, 2019 Windsor Lancers Female Athlete of the Year

OUA Awards
2011-12 OUA West Player of the Year : Jessica Clemencon
2010-11 OUA Player of the Year: Jessica Clemencon
2009-10 OUA West Rookie of the Year: Jessica Clemencon
2009-10 OUA West All-Rookie Team member: Jessica Clemencon
2016-17 OUA Rookie of the Year: Kayah Clarke

OUA All-Stars
First Team
2016-17 First Team: Emily Prevost
2012-13 OUA First Team all-star : Jessica Clemencon
2011-12 OUA First Team all-star : Jessica Clemencon
2010-11 OUA First Team all-star : Jessica Clemencon

Second Team
2016-17 Second Team: Cheyanne Roger

OUA All-Rookie
2016-17 OUA All-Rookie Team: Kayah Clarke

OUA Women’s Basketball Showcase

2018 Showcase Participant: Tyra Blizzard (named to Team Burns)

U Sports Awards
 Jessica Clemencon, 2010 Kathy Shields Award
 Jessica Clemencon, 2011 BLG Awards
 Jessica Clemencon, 2011 Nan Copp Award
 Korissa Williams, 2015 BLG Awards

2009-10 CIS All-Rookie Team Member: Jessica Clemencon
2009-10 CIS Rookie of the Year: Jessica Clemencon

All-Canadians
2012-13 CIS Second Team All-Canadian: Jessica Clemencon
2011-12 CIS All-Canadian: Jessica Clemencon

U Sports Nationals
2013 CIS National Championships Most Valuable Player: Korissa Williams
2015 CIS National Championships Most Valuable Player: Korissa Williams
2010-11 CIS First Team All-Canadian: Jessica Clemencon

Top 100
In celebration of the centennial anniversary of U SPORTS women’s basketball, a committee of U SPORTS women’s basketball coaches and partners revealed a list of the Top 100 women's basketball players. Commemorating the 100th anniversary of the first Canadian university women’s contest between the Queen’s Gaels and McGill Martlets on Feb. 6, 1920, the list of the Top 100 was gradually revealed over four weeks. Culminating with the All-Canadian Gala, which also recognized national award winners.  A total of three Windsor players were named to the list.

Lancers in pro basketball

References

U Sports women's basketball teams
Basketball, women's
Women in Ontario